Pietro Lunardi (born 19 July 1939) is an Italian politician and engineer.

Career
Born in Parma, he took his degree in civil engineering and transportation at the University of Padua in 1966.

He was Italian Minister for Infrastructure and Transportation from 2001 to 2006, and is the author of more than 130 publications.

References
 La Repubblica.it, Le biografie inglesi di Palazzo Chigi
 Pietro Lunardi, Design and construction of tunnels: analysis of controlled deformation in rocks and soils (ADECO-RS), シュプリンガー・ジャパン株式会社, 2008.

1939 births
Living people
Engineers from Parma
Forza Italia politicians
Transport ministers of Italy
Politicians from Parma